Corpus callosotomy is a palliative surgical procedure for the treatment of medically refractory epilepsy. In this procedure the corpus callosum is cut through in an effort to limit the spread of epileptic activity between the two halves of the brain.

After the operation the brain has much more difficulty sending messages between the hemispheres. Although the corpus callosum is the largest white matter tract connecting the hemispheres, some limited interhemispheric communication is still possible via the anterior commissure and posterior commissure.

"Efficacy and relatively low permanent morbidity in corpus callosotomy for medically intractable epilepsy have been demonstrated by more than six decades of experience. In addition to seizure reduction, behavior and quality of life may improve."

History
The first examples of corpus callosotomy were performed in the 1940s by Dr. William P. van Wagenen, who co-founded and served as president of the American Association of Neurological Surgeons. Attempting to treat epilepsy, van Wagenen studied and published the results of his surgeries, including the split-brain outcomes for patients. Wagenen's work preceded the 1981 Nobel Prize-winning research of Roger W. Sperry by two decades. Sperry studied patients who had undergone corpus callosotomy and detailed their resulting split-brain characteristics.

Improvements to surgical techniques, along with refinements of the indications, have allowed van Wagenen's procedure to endure; corpus callosotomy is still commonly performed throughout the world. Currently, the surgery is a palliative treatment method for many forms of epilepsy, including atonic seizures, generalized seizures, and Lennox-Gastaut syndrome. In a 2011 study of children with intractable epilepsy accompanied by attention deficit disorder, EEG showed an improvement to both seizures and attention impairments following corpus callosotomy.

Typical procedure 
Prior to surgery, the patient's head must be partially or completely shaven. Once under general anesthesia, an incision will allow for a craniotomy to be performed. Then sectioning will occur between the two hemispheres of the brain. For a partial callosotomy, the anterior two-thirds of the corpus callosum are sectioned, and for a complete callosotomy, the posterior one-third is also sectioned. After sectioning, the dura is closed and the portion of cranium is replaced. The scalp is then closed with sutures.
Endoscopic corpus callosotomy has been employed with blood loss minimized during the surgical procedure.

Indications
Corpus callosotomy is intended to treat patients who have epilepsy and the resultant chronic seizures. The diminished life expectancy associated with epilepsy patients has been documented by population-based studies in Europe. In the United Kingdom and Sweden, the relative mortality rate of epileptic patients (patients whose epilepsy was not under control from medical or other surgical therapies, and who continued to have the disease) increased two- and threefold, respectively. In the vast majority of cases, corpus callosotomy abolishes instance of seizures in the patient.

Contraindications
Although it varies from patient to patient, a progressive neurological or medical disease might be an absolute or relative contraindication to corpus callosotomy. Intellectual disability is not a contraindication to corpus callosotomy. In a study of children with a severe intellectual disability, total callosotomy was performed with highly favorable results and insignificant morbidity.

Neuroanatomical background

Corpus callosum anatomy and function

The corpus callosum is a fiber bundle of about 300 million fibers in the human brain that connects the two cerebral hemispheres. The interhemispheric functions of the corpus callosum include the integration of perceptual, cognitive, learned, and volitional information.

Role in epileptic seizures
The role of the corpus callosum in epilepsy is the interhemispheric transmission of epileptiform discharges. These discharges are generally bilaterally synchronous in preoperative patients. In addition to disrupting this synchrony, corpus callosotomy decreases the frequency and amplitude of the epileptiform discharges, suggesting the transhemispheric facilitation of seizure mechanisms.

Drawbacks and criticisms

Side effects

The most prominent non-surgical complications of corpus callosotomy relate to speech irregularities. For some patients, sectioning may be followed by a brief spell of mutism. A long-term side effect that some patients may have is an inability to engage in spontaneous speech. In addition, the resultant split-brain prevented some patients from following verbal commands that required use of their non-dominant hand.

Another complication is alien hand syndrome, in which the affected person's hand appears to take on a mind of its own.

Cognitive impairments may be seen. (Other symptoms may occur after the operation, but generally go away on their own: Scalp numbness, feeling tired or depressed, headaches, difficulty speaking, remembering things, or finding words.)

Alternatives
Epilepsy is also currently treated by a less invasive process called vagus nerve stimulation. This method utilizes an electrode implanted around the left vagus nerve within the carotid sheath in order to send electrical impulses to the nucleus of the solitary tract. However, corpus callosotomy has been proven to offer significantly better chances of seizure freedom compared with vagus nerve stimulation (58.0% versus 21.1% reduction in atonic seizures, respectively). If a focal area in the brain is generating severe seizures, it can sometimes be removed.

See also
 Corpus callosum
 Epilepsy
 Split-brain
 Vagus nerve stimulation

References

Further reading

External links 
 Detail on the procedure from epilepsy.com
 Encyclopedia of Surgery: Corpus callosotomy

Neurosurgical procedures
Epilepsy